Thalespora is a genus of fungi in the family Halosphaeriaceae. This is a monotypic genus, containing the single species Thalespora appendiculata.

References

External links
Thalespora at Index Fungorum

Microascales
Monotypic Sordariomycetes genera